Hiltrud Lotze (born 24 November 1958) is a German policewoman and politician of the Social Democratic Party (SPD) who has been serving as a member of the Bundestag from the state of Lower Saxony since 2020.

Political career 
Lotze became a member of the German Bundestag as a successor to Thomas Oppermann in November 2020. She is a member of the Committee on Food and Agriculture.

References

External links 
  
 Bundestag biography 

1958 births
Living people
Members of the Bundestag for Lower Saxony
Female members of the Bundestag
21st-century German women politicians
Members of the Bundestag 2017–2021
Members of the Bundestag for the Social Democratic Party of Germany